Michael Duggan began his career writing in 1981 for the TV show Hill Street Blues and then moved on to shows such as St. Elsewhere and Law & Order. He began producing television shows in 1984 with Miami Vice and Midnight Run. Duggan has executive produced the series Earth 2 and part of the third season of Millennium.

Writer 
 Miss Miami (2002)
 Secret Agent Man (2000)
 Millennium (1998)
 C-16: FBI (1997)
 Brooklyn South (1997)
 Earth 2 (1994)
 Crime & Punishment (1993)
 Law & Order (1990–1992)
 Nasty Boys (1990)
 Miami Vice (1988)
 St. Elsewhere (1982)
 Hill Street Blues (1981)

Producer 
 Miss Miami (2002)
 Secret Agent Man (2000)
 Millennium (1996–1998)
 C-16: FBI (1997)
 Earth 2 (1994–1995)
 Midnight Runaround (1994)
 Another Midnight Run (1994)
 Crime & Punishment (1993)
 Law & Order (1990–1993)
 Nasty Boys (1990)
 Midnight Run (1988)
 Miami Vice (1984–1989)

Director 

 The F**k It List (2019)

See also 

 Dugan
 Seán Mór Ó Dubhagáin (died 1372) Gaelic-Irish  poet.
 Patrick Duggan (10 November 1813-15 August 1896) Roman Catholic Bishop of Clonfert.
 Tomás Bacach Ó Dúgáin, (fl. 1848-1858), scribe.
 Maolsheachlainn Ó Dúgáin, (fl. mid-19th century), scribe.
 Liam Ó Dúgáin, (fl. mid-19th century), scribe.
 Seánie Duggan (born 1922), retired Irish sportsman.
 Joe Dugan (1897–1982), American baseball player from 1917–1931
 General Michael Dugan (born 1937), former Chief of Staff of the United States Air Force
 Raymond Smith Dugan, (1878–1940), American Astronomer, textbook author and professor at Princeton University
 Jeremiah Duggan (1980–2003), British student who died in disputed circumstances linked to the LaRouche movement.

Creative consultant 
 Millennium (1996)
 H.E.L.P. (1990)

External links 
 

American television producers
Living people
Place of birth missing (living people)
Year of birth missing (living people)